El ciudadano Simón is a 3-act zarzuela by Spanish composer . The zarzuela was first staged at Circo Price (Madrid) on 6 December 1900.

Roles

Musical Numbers
Prelude
Act I:
No. 1a. Chorus of female villagers (aldeanas). Cuídame el cantarito (female chorus)
No. 1b. ¡Yo borrico! (Pedro, female chorus)
No. 1c. Vámonos todos a preparar (Pedro, mixed chorus of villagers)
No. 2. Duo. Llorad. Sois desgraciada (Magdalena, Lubersac)
No. 3. Romanza. ¡Ay de mi! ¿De mi inocencia...? (Simón)
No. 4. Finale. ¡Alto! ¡Descansen en su lugar! (Magdalena, Simón, Pedro, the Count, Lubersac, a Sergeant, mixed chorus)
Act II:
No. 5a. Prelude and Chorus of villagers. Terminadas las faenas (mixed chorus)
No. 5b. ¡Felices! — ¡Hola Pedro! (Pedro, mixed chorus)
No. 6. Quartet. Ciudadanos. — Ciudadanos. — Ellos son aquí estan (Enriqueta, Virginia, the Count, Diógenes)
No. 7. Duo. ¡Mi Enriqueta! — ¡Mi Luciano! (Enriqueta, Luciano)
No. 8. La cosa me disgusta y estoy por escapar (Luciano, Pedro)
No. 8bis. (instrumental)
No. 9. Finale. ¡Ciudadano Simón, te buscaba! (Magdalena, Virginia, Simón, Pedro, Lubersac, Diógenes, mixed chorus)
Act III:
Preludio (instrumental)
No. 10. ¡No me han visto! ¡Se alejan! (Magdalena, Luciano, Simón)
No. 11a. ¡Ya se fuerme! ¡Si me encuentran...! (Lubersac, later Magdalena, Luciano)
No. 11b. Señor, señor, mi súplica escuchad (Magdalena)
No. 11c. Esplendidos lucen los rayos del sol (mixed chorus of fishermen, behind the scenes) — Dios de las alturas (Enriqueta, mixed chorus)
Finale (instrumental)

References

External links

Spanish-language operas
1900 operas
Zarzuelas
Operas by Manuel Manrique de Lara
Operas set in France